Vern Drake (born 16 April 1946) is  a former Australian rules footballer who played with Fitzroy in the Victorian Football League (VFL) in the number 41 jumper. 	

Drake spent 1967 playing under Fred Wooller in Tasmania with the Penguin Football Club.

Drake was captain-coach of Arian Park / Mirrool Football Club in the South West Football League (New South Wales) in 1968, then moved onto coach Shepparton United Football Club in 1969. He then coached Benalla Football Club from 1970 to 1972.

Drake then coached Cooee Football Club to the 1973 North Western Football Union premiership.

Drake was later captain coach of North Albury Football Club, eventually kicking 617 goals in the Ovens & Murray Football League, which included his goals kicked at Benalla.

Drake later settled in Albury and established the Vern Drake Real Estate business.

Notes

External links 		
		
		
1966 photo of V Drake
		
		
		
		
Living people		
1946 births		
		
Australian rules footballers from Victoria (Australia)		
Fitzroy Football Club players